The Michigan Compassionate Care Initiative was an indirect initiated state statute that allowed the medical use of marijuana for seriously ill patients. It was approved by voters as Proposal 1 on November 6, 2008, 63 percent in favor to 37 percent opposed.

Specifically, the measure:

 Allows terminally and seriously ill patients to use marijuana with their doctors' approval.
 Permits qualifying patients or their caregivers to cultivate their own marijuana for their medical use, with limits on the amount they could possess.
 Creates identification cards for registered patients and establish penalties for false statements and fraudulent ID cards.
 Allows patients and their caregivers who are arrested to discuss their medical use in court.
 Maintains prohibitions on public use of marijuana and driving under the influence of marijuana.

Supporters
The primary proponents of the initiative are the Michigan Coalition for Compassionate Care (MCCC). Former state representative Dianne Byrum (D) is chairwoman of the coalition.

Organizations

 Marijuana Policy Project, 
 National Organization for the Reform of Marijuana Laws (NORML)
 National Organization for the Reform of Marijuana Laws (NORML) - Michigan Chapter
 StoptheDrugWar.com

Arguments in favor
 Prevents people from being threatened with prison for trying to relieve pain from a serious illness
 Some people are unable to take other drugs and marijuana is the only drug that alleviates a debilitating condition such as nausea or inability to eat.
 The law is narrow in scope as it deals only with medical marijuana
 Requires a doctor's certification of need to be covered under law
 There is a mandatory state registration system in place to assure the law is not abused.

Medical Access to Marijuana is supported by: 

 American Academy of HIV Medicine
 American Bar Association
 American College of Physicians
 American Nurses Association
 American Public Health Association
 Aids Action Council
 Leukemia and Lymphoma Society 
 Lymphoma Foundation of America
 National Association of People With Aids
 National Association of Attorneys General

In February 2008, delegates at the Michigan Democratic Party Convention unanimously passed a resolution in favor of protecting patients from arrest.

Michigan has already passed local medical marijuana initiatives in five cities—Ann Arbor, Detroit, Ferndale, Flint, and Traverse City—and by large margins.

A poll by Marketing Resource Group in March 2008 showed 67% of voters saying they supported medical marijuana and 62% voicing approval for this particular initiative. Voters between 34 and 54 showed 75% support for medical marijuana, with 63% of retirees voicing support. Younger voters (18 to 34) were the least supportive, with 61% backing the measure.

Arguments against

 There is a drug on the market called Marinol that has similar effects and is prescribed
 Smoking a substance brings additional health risks

State medical society takes neutral position
The Michigan State Medical Society took a neutral position on this ballot measure, as well as on two other initiatives related to health care at its annual delegates meeting in early May 2008.

Status
The measure was presented to the Michigan State Legislature for passage on March 3, 2008, after supporters submitted sufficient signatures on petitions, but the legislature failed to act on the measure within the 40 days set by law, earning it a place on the November 2008 ballot as Question 1, where it was approved by voters.

Results

References

External links
MCCC Official Campaign Site
Full text of initiative
MedicalMJ.org: Michigan Medical Marijuana Initiative Petition Approved For Circulation
Michigan NORML web site

2008 cannabis law reform
Cannabis ballot measures in the United States
cannabis in Michigan
Michigan law
Healthcare in Michigan